Balintawak may refer to:

 Balintawak or Balingasa, a district of Quezon City, Philippines
 Balintawak, a simple, three-piece style of Baro’t saya, a popular form of female Filipino national dress
 Balintawak Eskrima, a Filipino martial art
 Balintawak station, a station on the Manila LRT Line 1
 Balintawak Interchange, a junction between the North Luzon Expressway and Epifanio de los Santos Avenue
 Balintawak (dress), also known as the "cocktail terno", a shorter version of the traditional traje de mestiza formal dress of the Philippines

See also
 Cry of Pugad Lawin, also known as the Cry of Balintawak 
 Melchora Aquino, also called the Mother of Balintawak